Rodor Sithi (lit. "Sunshine in a Letter") is a 2014 Indian Assamese language musical drama film directed by Baharul Islam; based on a play titled Beyond the Obvious written by the director himself. The film is produced by Ikramul Majid under the banner of Alternative Cinematics and stars Zubeen Garg, Papon, Bhagirathi and Adil Hussain in the lead roles.

Cast 
 Bhagirathi 
 Adil Hussain
 Zubeen Garg
 Papon
 Jyoti Narayan Nath
 Nani Borpujari
 Barkha Bahar
 Pallabi Phukan
 Sasanka Samir
 Fairy Priya Ahmed
 Momi Borah

Soundtrack

The music of the film is composed by Zubeen Garg with vocals by Papon and Garg himself. The album contains 6 tracks.

External links

References 

2014 films
Films set in Assam
2010s Assamese-language films